The List of painters in the Los Angeles County Museum of Art collections is a list of the artists indexed in the Los Angeles County Museum of Art website whose works in their collection were painted. The museum's collections are spread throughout several locations in Los Angeles, and not all works are on display.  The entire collection houses over 120,000 objects, thousands of which are on view at any given time, and only 1,676 of these are paintings. In the following list, the painter's name is followed by the number of their paintings in the collection, with a link to all of their works available on the LACMA website. For artists with more than one type of work in the collection, or for works by artists not listed here, see the LACMA website or the corresponding Wikimedia Commons category. Of artists listed, less than 10% are women.
For the complete list of artists and their artworks in the collection, see the website.

A
Pieter Coecke van Aelst (1502–1550), 1 painting : LACMA
Juan Francisco de Aguilera (1671–?), 1 painting : LACMA
Josef Albers (1888–1976), 4 paintings : LACMA
Lita Albuquerque (b.1946), 8 paintings : LACMA
Martha Joanne Alf (1930–2019), 2 paintings : LACMA
Alessandro Allori (1535–1607), 1 painting : LACMA
Carlos Almaraz (1941–1989), 2 paintings : LACMA
John Altoon (1925–1969), 2 paintings : LACMA
Mabel Alvarez (1891–1985), 1 painting : LACMA
Francis Alÿs (b.1959), 2 paintings : LACMA
Eleanor Antin (b.1935), 1 painting : LACMA
Gioacchino Assereto (1600–1649), 1 painting : LACMA
Hendrick Avercamp (1585–1634), 1 painting : LACMA
Ayad Alkadhi (b.1971), 1 painting : LACMA

B
Joseph Badger (c.1707–1765), 1 painting : LACMA
Derick Baegert (1476–1515), 1 painting : LACMA
Jo Baer (b.1929), 2 paintings : LACMA
Giovanni Baglione (1566–1643), 1 painting : LACMA
Baisao (1675–1763), 1 painting (calligraphy) : LACMA
Jules de Balincourt (b.1972), 1 painting : LACMA
Banjin Dōtan (1698–1775), 1 painting : LACMA
Fra Bartolomeo (1472–1517), 1 painting : LACMA
Luis Arenal Bastar (1909–1985), 2 paintings : LACMA
Max Beckmann (1884–1950), 1 painting : LACMA
José Bedia (b.1959), 1 painting : LACMA
Larry Bell (b.1939), 3 paintings : LACMA
Jacopo Bellini (1400–1471), 1 painting : LACMA
George Bellows (1882–1925), 3 paintings : LACMA
Billy Al Bengston (b.1934), 3 paintings : LACMA
Karl Benjamin (1925–2012), 2 paintings : LACMA
Tony Berlant (b.1941), 1 painting : LACMA
Sven Berlin (1911–1999), 2 paintings : LACMA
Pedro Berruguete (1450–1504), 1 painting : LACMA
Jean-Victor Bertin (1767–1842), 1 painting : LACMA
Linda Besemer (b.1957), 1 painting : LACMA
Edward Biberman (1904–1986), 3 paintings : LACMA
Neri di Bicci (1418–1492), 1 painting : LACMA
Francesco Bissolo (c.1470–1554), 1 painting : LACMA
Joseph Blackburn (painter) (1700–c.1778), 2 paintings : LACMA
Streeter Blair (1888–1966), 2 paintings : LACMA
Ralph Albert Blakelock (1847–1919), 1 painting : LACMA
Jan Frans van Bloemen (1662–1749), 2 paintings : LACMA
Jan Boeckhorst (1604–1688), 1 painting : LACMA
Louis-Léopold Boilly (1761–1845), 2 paintings : LACMA
Guy Pène du Bois (1884–1958), 2 paintings : LACMA
Hans Bol (1534–1593), 1 painting : LACMA
Paris Bordone (1500–1571), 1 painting : LACMA
Michaël Borremans (b.1963), 1 painting : LACMA
Anthonie van Borssom (1631–1677), 1 painting : LACMA
Ambrosius Bosschaert (1573–1621), 1 painting : LACMA
François Boucher (1703–1770), 6 paintings : LACMA
Aelbrecht Bouts (1451–1549), 1 painting : LACMA
Georges Braque (1882–1963), 3 paintings : LACMA
Victor Brauner (1903–1966), 2 paintings : LACMA
Salomon de Bray (1597–1664), 1 painting : LACMA
Dirck de Bray (1635–1694), 2 paintings : LACMA
Nicolas-Guy Brenet (1728–1792), 2 paintings : LACMA
Moretto da Brescia (ca. 1498–1554), 1 painting : LACMA
Alfred Thompson Bricher (1837–1908), 2 paintings : LACMA
Jan Brueghel the Elder (1568–1624), 1 painting : LACMA
Barthel Bruyn the Elder (1493–1553), 1 painting : LACMA
Linda Burnham (b.1950), 1 painting : LACMA
Yosa Buson (1716–1783), 1 painting : LACMA
Byeon Sangbyeok (18th Century), 1 painting : LACMA

C
Jan van de Cappelle (1626–1679), 1 painting : LACMA
Gregory Card (b.1945), 2 paintings : LACMA
Eugène Carrière (1849–1906), 2 paintings : LACMA
John Carroll (1892–1959), 2 paintings : LACMA
Mary Cassatt (1844–1926), 2 paintings : LACMA
Giovanni Benedetto Castiglione (1609–1664), 1 painting : LACMA
Elise Cavanna (1902–1963), 10 paintings : LACMA
Enrique Martinez Celaya (b.1964), 1 painting : LACMA
Paul Cézanne (1839–1906), 3 paintings : LACMA
Enrique Chagoya (b.1953), 1 painting : LACMA
Jean Charlot (1898–1979), 7 paintings : LACMA
William Merritt Chase (1849–1916), 3 paintings : LACMA
Chen Shaomei (1901–1954), 1 painting : LACMA
Cheng Zhengkui (c.1604–1670), 1 painting : LACMA
Chi-Chien Wang (1907–2003), 2 paintings : LACMA
William Christenberry (1936–2016), 1 painting : LACMA
Petrus Christus (1415–1476), 1 painting : LACMA
James Goodwyn Clonney (1812–1867), 1 painting : LACMA
Boyd Clopton (1935–1989), 5 paintings : LACMA
Thomas Cole (1801–1848), 2 paintings : LACMA
Robert Colescott (1925–2009), 3 paintings : LACMA
Cima da Conegliano (ca. 1459–1517/18), 1 painting : LACMA
Ron Cooper (b.1943), 2 paintings : LACMA
Adriaen Coorte (1660–1707), 1 painting : LACMA
John Singleton Copley (1738–1815), 2 paintings : LACMA
Jean-Baptiste-Camille Corot (1796–1875), 2 paintings : LACMA
Juan Correa (1646–1716), 1 painting : LACMA
Antonio da Correggio (1489–1534), 1 painting : LACMA
Mary Corse (b.1945), 2 paintings : LACMA
Pietro da Cortona (1596–1669), 1 painting : LACMA
Jasper Francis Cropsey (1823–1900), 2 paintings : LACMA
Aelbert Cuyp (1620–1691), 2 paintings : LACMA

D
Daidō Bunka (1680–1752), 2 paintings : LACMA
Daishin Gitō (1657–1730), 1 painting : LACMA
Dario di Giovanni (1420–1495), 1 painting : LACMA
Charles-François Daubigny (1817–1878), 3 paintings : LACMA
Arthur Bowen Davies (1862–1928), 2 paintings : LACMA
Ronald Davis (b.1937), 2 paintings : LACMA
Deiryū Kutsu (1895–1954), 2 paintings : LACMA
Eugène Delacroix (1798–1863), 2 paintings : LACMA
Alexandre-François Desportes (1661–1743), 1 painting : LACMA
Narcisse Virgilio Díaz (1807–1876), 2 paintings : LACMA
Richard Diebenkorn (1922–1993), 2 paintings : LACMA
Abraham van Diepenbeeck (1596–1675), 1 painting : LACMA
Dietmar Lutz (b.1968), 1 painting : LACMA
Kim Dingle (b.1951), 2 paintings : LACMA
Gaspare Diziani (1689–1767), 1 painting : LACMA
Tomory Dodge (b.1974), 1 painting : LACMA
Kaye Donachie (b.1970), 1 painting : LACMA
Roy Dowell (b.1951), 1 painting : LACMA
Jean Dubuffet (1901–1985), 2 paintings : LACMA
Marlene Dumas (b.1953), 1 painting : LACMA

E
Thomas Eakins (1844–1916), 2 paintings : LACMA
Jack Earl (b.1934), 1 painting : LACMA
Tim Ebner (b.1953), 3 paintings : LACMA
Jacob Eichholtz (1776–1842), 2 paintings : LACMA
Nicolás Enríquez (1704–1790), 2 paintings : LACMA
Antonio de Espinosa (17th Century), 6 paintings : LACMA
Eto Reigen (1721–1785), 1 painting : LACMA
Edgar Ewing (1913–2006), 2 paintings : LACMA

F
Fei Danxu (1801–1850), 1 painting : LACMA
Lorser Feitelson (1898–1978), 2 paintings : LACMA
Chris Finley (b.1971), 1 painting : LACMA
Rosso Fiorentino (1494–1541), 1 painting : LACMA
Lavinia Fontana (1552–1614), 1 painting : LACMA
Jean-Louis Forain (1852–1931), 2 paintings : LACMA
Helen Forbes (1891–1945), 1 painting : LACMA
Llyn Foulkes (b.1934), 3 paintings : LACMA
Sam Francis (1923–1994), 3 paintings : LACMA
Alexander Fraser (1827–1899), 1 painting : LACMA
Bartolo di Fredi (ca. 1330–ca. 1410), 2 paintings : LACMA
Pedro Friedeberg (b.1936), 3 paintings : LACMA
Pia Fries (b.1955), 1 painting : LACMA
Fūgai Ekun (1568–c.1654), 4 paintings : LACMA
Fūgai Honkō (1779–1847), 1 painting : LACMA
Fukyū (18th Century), 1 painting : LACMA
Charlotte Eustace Sophie de Fuligny-Damas (1741–1828), 1 painting : LACMA

G
Gai Qi (1774–1829), 1 painting : LACMA
Gajin Fujita (b.1972), 1 painting : LACMA
Louis Galloche (1670–1761), 2 paintings : LACMA
Ubaldo Gandolfi (1728–1781), 2 paintings : LACMA
Gang Jinhui (1851–1919), 1 painting : LACMA
Juan GarcÍa (b.1959), 2 paintings : LACMA
Jedd Garet (b.1955), 1 painting : LACMA
Paul Gauguin (1848–1903), 4 paintings : LACMA
Geiai (fl.1550–1600), 1 painting : LACMA
Don Silvestro dei Gherarducci (1339–1399), 1 painting : LACMA
Giovanni di Paolo (1403–1482), 1 painting : LACMA
Lawrence Gipe (b.1962), 1 painting : LACMA
Joe Goode (b.1937), 2 paintings : LACMA
Mary Ann Goodman (?), 2 paintings : LACMA
Arshile Gorky (1904–1948), 5 paintings : LACMA
Goshun (1752–1811), 1 painting : LACMA
Adolph Gottlieb (1903–1974), 2 paintings : LACMA
Jan van Goyen (1596–1656), 2 paintings : LACMA
John R. Grabach (1886–1981), 2 paintings : LACMA
Morris Graves (1910–2001), 2 paintings : LACMA
El Greco (1541–1614), 1 painting : LACMA
Mark Grotjahn (b.1968), 1 painting : LACMA
Guo Dawei (1919–2003), 1 painting : LACMA
Philip Guston (1913–1980), 2 paintings : LACMA
Felipe Santiago Gutiérrez (1824–1904), 1 painting : LACMA

H
Hakuin Ekaku (1685–1768), 9 paintings : LACMA
Noël Hallé (1711–1781), 1 painting : LACMA
Frans Hals (1582–1666), 2 paintings : LACMA
Hanabusa Itchō (1652–1724), 1 painting : LACMA 1 attributed : LACMA
Marc Handelman (b.1975), 1 painting : LACMA
Armin Carl Hansen (1886–1957), 1 painting : LACMA
Sophie Harpe (1895–1981), 2 paintings : LACMA
Marsden Hartley (1877–1943), 1 painting : LACMA
Childe Hassam (1859–1935), 3 paintings : LACMA
Tim Hawkinson (b.1960), 1 painting : LACMA
Jan Davidsz. de Heem (1606–1683), 2 paintings : LACMA
Sophie von Hellermann (b.1975), 1 painting : LACMA
Robert Henri (1865–1929), 3 paintings : LACMA
Boza Hessova (1889–1981), 2 paintings : LACMA
Hirafuku Hyakusui (1877–1933), 1 painting : LACMA
Meindert Hobbema (1638–1709), 2 paintings : LACMA
David Hockney (b.1937), 2 paintings : LACMA
Hans Hofmann (1880–1966), 2 paintings : LACMA
Hans Holbein the Younger (1497–1543), 1 painting : LACMA
Winslow Homer (1836–1910), 2 paintings : LACMA
Hōsai (18th Century), 2 paintings : LACMA
Hosoda Eishi (1756–1829), 1 painting : LACMA
Huang Binhong (1865–1955), 3 paintings : LACMA
Darcy Huebler (b.1957), 1 painting : LACMA
William Morris Hunt (1824–1879), 2 paintings : LACMA

I
Inka Essenhigh (b.1969), 1 painting : LACMA
Henry Inman (1801–1846), 2 paintings : LACMA
George Inness (1825–1894), 2 paintings : LACMA
Adriaen Isenbrandt (1485–1551), 1 painting : LACMA
Iten Sōsei (1472–1554), 2 paintings : LACMA
Itō Jakuchū (1716–1800), 2 paintings : LACMA

J
James Jarvaise (1924–2015), 2 paintings : LACMA
John Wesley Jarvis (1780–1840), 2 paintings : LACMA
Alexej von Jawlensky (1864–1941), 2 paintings : LACMA
Jayateja (15th Century), 1 painting : LACMA
Neil Jenney (b.1945), 2 paintings : LACMA
Judy Bally Jensen (b.1953), 1 painting : LACMA
Ynez Johnston (1920–2019), 2 paintings : LACMA
Ludolf Leendertsz de Jongh (1616–1679), 1 painting : LACMA
Raymond Jonson (1891–1982), 2 paintings : LACMA
Juan Rodríguez Juárez (1675–1728), 1 painting : LACMA

K
Willem Kalf (1619–1693), 1 painting : LACMA
Kameda Bōsai (1752–1826), 2 paintings : LACMA
Kamisaka Sekka (1866–1942), 3 paintings : LACMA
Wassily Kandinsky (1866–1944), 2 paintings : LACMA
Kano Eishin (1613–1685), 1 painting : LACMA
Kano Masunobu (1625–1694), 2 paintings : LACMA
Kano Naonobu (1607–1650), 1 painting : LACMA
Kanō Tan'yū (1602–1674), 1 painting : LACMA 1 attributed: LACMA
Kawanabe Kyōsai (1831–1889), 27 paintings : LACMA
Kawanabe Kyōsai (attributed), 9 paintings : LACMA
Keishū Itaya (1729–1797), 1 painting : LACMA
William Keith (1838–1911), 2 paintings : LACMA
Ellsworth Kelly (1923–2015), 2 paintings : LACMA
Habib Kheradyar (b.1958), 1 painting : LACMA
Kim Chin'u (19th Century), 1 painting : LACMA
Kim Giyeop (late 19th–early 20th Centuries), 1 painting : LACMA
Kim Hongdo (1745–c.1806/14), 1 painting : LACMA
Ernst Ludwig Kirchner (1880–1938), 4 paintings : LACMA
R. B. Kitaj (1932–2007), 1 painting : LACMA
Kitamuki Unchiku (1623–1703), 1 painting : LACMA
Paul Klee (1879–1940), 2 paintings : LACMA
Kō Sūkoku (1730–1804), 3 paintings : LACMA
Kobayashi Kiyochika (1847–1915), 1 painting : LACMA
Kobayashi Kokei (1883–1957), 1 painting : LACMA
Koen van den (b.1973), 1 painting : LACMA
Komai Ki (1747–1797), 1 painting : LACMA
Philip de Koninck (1619–1688), 2 paintings : LACMA
Emil Jean Kosa (1903–1968), 2 paintings : LACMA
Guillermo Kuitca (b.1961), 1 painting : LACMA
František Kupka (1871–1957), 2 paintings : LACMA
Kusumi Morikage (c.1620–1690), 1 painting : LACMA
Kuwabara Kōnan (1906–1988), 1 painting : LACMA

L
Louis Lafitte (1770–1828), 1 painting : LACMA
Wifredo Lam (1902–1982), 1 painting : LACMA
Fitz Henry Lane (1804–1865), 2 paintings : LACMA
Jérôme-Martin Langlois (1779–1838), 1 painting : LACMA
Jonathan Lasker (b.1948), 1 painting : LACMA
Paul Lauritz (1889–1975), 2 paintings : LACMA
Fernand Léger (1881–1955), 3 paintings : LACMA
François Lemoyne (1688–1737), 1 painting : LACMA
John Lessore (b.1939), 1 painting : LACMA
Roy Lichtenstein (1923–1997), 2 paintings : LACMA
Charles-André van Loo (1705–1765), 2 paintings : LACMA
Vicente López y Portaña (1772–1850), 1 painting : LACMA
Anthonie de Lorme (1610–1673), 1 painting : LACMA
Morris Louis (1912–1962), 3 paintings : LACMA
Jorg Lozek (b.1971), 1 painting : LACMA
Luca di Tommè (1356–1389), 2 paintings : LACMA
Gilbert Lujan (1940–2011), 1 painting : LACMA
George Luks (1867–1933), 2 paintings : LACMA
Helen Lundeberg (1908–1999), 4 paintings : LACMA

M
Master of the Bargello Tondo (1400–1450), 1 painting : LACMA
Master of the Legend of St. Ursula (Bruges) (1436–1505), 1 painting : LACMA
Master of the Female Half-Lengths (fl.1530–1540), 1 painting : LACMA
Master of the Fiesole Epiphany (fl.1475–1496), 1 painting : LACMA
Master of the Legend of Saint Lucy (fl.1480–1510), 1 painting : LACMA
Master of Osma (16th Century), 1 painting : LACMA
Stanton Macdonald-Wright (1890–1973), 2 paintings : LACMA
Marcin Maciejowski (b.1974), 1 painting : LACMA
Alessandro Magnasco (1667–1749), 2 paintings : LACMA
René Magritte (1898–1967), 2 paintings : LACMA
Man Ray (1890–1976), 2 paintings : LACMA
Jan Mandijn (1500–1560), 1 painting : LACMA
Rutilio di Lorenzo Manetti (1571–1639), 1 painting : LACMA
Edward Middleton Manigault (1877–1922), 1 painting : LACMA
Rocco Marconi (?–1529), 1 painting : LACMA
Kerry James Marshall (b.1955), 1 painting : LACMA
Maruyama Ōkyo (1733–1795), 5 paintings : LACMA 1 attributed : LACMA
Maruyama Ōshin (1790–1838), 1 painting : LACMA
Maruyama Ōzui (1766–1829), 1 painting : LACMA
Andrés Marzal de Sas (fl.1393–1410), 1 painting : LACMA
Quentin Matsys (1466–1530), 1 painting : LACMA
Roberto Matta (1911–2002), 2 paintings : LACMA
Jan Matulka (1890–1972), 2 paintings : LACMA
Keith Mayerson (b.1966), 1 painting : LACMA
Pier Francesco Mazzucchelli (1573–1625), 1 painting : LACMA
Evelyn McCormick (1869–1948), 1 painting : LACMA
Henry Lee McFee (1886–1953), 2 paintings : LACMA
Barry McGee (b.1966), 1 painting : LACMA
Kelly McLane (b.1968), 1 painting : LACMA
John McLaughlin (1898–1976), 3 paintings : LACMA
Sandra Mendelsohn Rubin (b.1947), 2 paintings : LACMA
Carlos Mérida (1891–1985), 4 paintings : LACMA
Knud Merrild (1894–1954), 3 paintings : LACMA
Gerhard Merz (b.1947), 1 painting : LACMA
Frans van Mieris the Younger (1689–1763), 1 painting : LACMA
John Millei (b.1958), 1 painting : LACMA
Jean-François Millet (1814–1875), 2 paintings : LACMA
Joan Miró (1893–1983), 2 paintings : LACMA
Amedeo Modigliani (1884–1920), 2 paintings : LACMA
Louise Moillon (1609–1696), 1 painting : LACMA
Isaac Moillon (1614–1673), 1 painting : LACMA
Claude Monet (1840–1926), 3 paintings : LACMA
Juan Patricio Morlete Ruiz (1713–1772), 6 paintings : LACMA
Ed Moses (1926–2018), 2 paintings : LACMA
Robert Motherwell (1915–1991), 2 paintings : LACMA
Lee Mullican (1919–1998), 2 paintings : LACMA
Matt Mullican (b.1951), 3 paintings : LACMA
Munakata Shikō (1903–1975), 2 paintings : LACMA

N
Nagasawa Rosetsu (1754–1799), 2 paintings : LACMA
Nakabayashi Chikkei (1816–1867), 2 paintings : LACMA
Nakabayashi Chikutō (1776–1853), 2 paintings : LACMA
Nakahara Nantenbō (1839–1925), 7 paintings : LACMA
Nakamura Hōchū (?–1819), 2 paintings : LACMA
Nanzan Kōryō (1756–1839), 3 paintings : LACMA
Nasser Al Salem (b.1984), 1 painting : LACMA
Robert Natkin (1930–2010), 2 paintings : LACMA
David Neal (1838–1915), 1 painting : LACMA
Aert van der Neer (1603–1677), 1 painting : LACMA

O
Obaku Taihō (1691–1774), 2 paintings : LACMA
Ogata Kōrin (1658–1716), 1 painting : LACMA
Pablo O'Higgins (1904–1983), 2 paintings : LACMA
Okada Beisanjin (1744–1820), 1 painting : LACMA
Okada Hankō (1782–1846), 2 paintings :  LACMA
Okamoto Jōen (1628–1673), 1 painting : LACMA
Okamoto Shūki (1807–1862), 5 paintings : LACMA
Okamoto Toyohiko (1773–1845), 1 painting : LACMA
Margit Omar (b.1941), 2 paintings : LACMA
Gordon Onslow Ford (1912–2003), 2 paintings : LACMA
José Clemente Orozco (1883–1949), 1 painting : LACMA
Ōtagaki Rengetsu (1791–1875), 2 paintings : LACMA
Ōtsuki Bankei (1801–1878), 1 painting : LACMA
Sabina Ott (1955–2018), 1 painting : LACMA
Laura Owens (b.1970), 1 painting : LACMA

P
José de Páez (1720–1790), 2 paintings : LACMA
Pan Simu (1756–1839), 4 paintings : LACMA
Joseph Parrocel (1646–1704), 2 paintings : LACMA
Jean-Baptiste Pater (1695–1736), 1 painting : LACMA
Edgar Alwin Payne (1882–1947), 1 painting : LACMA
Rembrandt Peale (1778–1860), 2 paintings : LACMA
Max Pechstein (1881–1955), 3 paintings : LACMA
Antonio Francesco Peruzzini (1643–1724), 1 painting : LACMA
Paolo Piazza (1557–1621), 1 painting : LACMA
Giovanni Battista Piazzetta (1682–1754), 1 painting : LACMA
Pablo Picasso (1881–1973), 4 paintings : LACMA
Camille Pissarro (1830–1903), 4 paintings : LACMA
Giambattista Pittoni (1687–1767), 1 paintings : LACMA
Giacomo del Po (1652–1726), 2 paintings : LACMA
Jan Polack (ca. 1450–1519), 1 painting : LACMA
Jan Porcellis (1584–1632), 1 painting : LACMA
Frans Post (1612–1680), 1 painting : LACMA
Richard Pousette-Dart (1916–1992), 2 paintings : LACMA
Melville Price (1920–1970), 1 painting : LACMA
Monique Prieto (b.1962), 1 painting : LACMA
Mitsuko Aoyama (1874–1941), 1 painting : LACMA
Adam Pynacker (1622–1673), 1 painting : LACMA

Q
Qi Feng (19th Century), 1 painting : LACMA

R
David Ratcliff (b.1970), 1 painting : LACMA
Michael Reafsnyder (b.1969), 1 painting : LACMA
Granville Redmond (1871–1935), 2 paintings : LACMA
Rembrandt (1606–1669), 3 paintings : LACMA
Pierre-Auguste Renoir (1841–1919), 2 paintings : LACMA
Jean-Bernard Restout (1732–1797), 3 paintings : LACMA
Jean II Restout (1692–1768), 1 painting : LACMA
Joshua Reynolds (1723–1792), 1 painting : LACMA
Guido Reni (1575–1642), 2 paintings : LACMA
Sebastiano Ricci (1659–1734), 2 paintings : LACMA
John Hubbard Rich (1876–1954), 2 paintings : LACMA
Louis Ritman (1889–1963), 1 painting : LACMA
Diego Rivera (1886–1957), 2 paintings : LACMA
Johann Martin von Rohden (1778–1868), 1 painting : LACMA
Ruth Root (b.1967), 1 painting : LACMA
Martinus Rørbye (1803–1878), 2 paintings : LACMA
Salvator Rosa (1615–1673), 2 paintings : LACMA
Salvator Rosa (1615–1673), 2 paintings : LACMA
Bernardo Rossellino (1409–1464), 1 painting : LACMA
Georges Rouault (1871–1958), 2 paintings : LACMA
Théodore Rousseau (1812–1867), 2 paintings : LACMA
Peter Paul Rubens (1577–1640), 2 paintings : LACMA
Jacob Isaacksz van Ruisdael (1628–1682), 3 paintings : LACMA
Salomon van Ruysdael (1602–1670), 3 paintings : LACMA
Ruocheng Zhang (1722–1770), 1 painting : LACMA
Edward Ruscha (b.1937), 2 paintings : LACMA
Anne Ryan (1889–1954), 2 paintings : LACMA

S
Jacques Sablet (1749–1803), 3 paintings : LACMA
Pieter Jansz. Saenredam (1597–1665), 1 painting : LACMA
Jean-Pierre Saint-Ours (1752–1809), 2 paintings : LACMA
Sakai Hōitsu (1761–1828), 37 paintings : LACMA
Sakaki Hyakusen (1697–1753), 2 paintings : LACMA
Sakamoto Kojo (1875–1969), 1 painting : LACMA
Sandeep Mukherjee (b.1964), 2 paintings : LACMA
John Singer Sargent (1856–1925), 3 paintings : LACMA
Rolph Scarlett (1889–1984), 1 painting : LACMA
Ary Scheffer (1795–1858), 2 paintings : LACMA
Christoph Schmidberger (b.1974), 1 painting : LACMA
Dana Schutz (b.1976), 1 painting : LACMA
Sekkan (fl.1555–1558), 1 painting : LACMA
Sen Sōshitsu XV (b.1923), 1 painting : LACMA
Sengai Gibon (1750–1837), 2 paintings : LACMA
Sesshū Tōyō (1420–1506), 1 painting : LACMA
Sesson Shūkei (c.1504–c.1590), 2 paintings : LACMA
Millard Sheets (1907–1989), 2 paintings : LACMA
Kate Shepherd (b.1961), 1 painting : LACMA
Shibata Zeshin (1807–1891), 2 paintings : LACMA
Shikibu Terutada (16th Century), 1 painting : LACMA
Henrietta Shore (1880–1963), 2 paintings : LACMA
Shōrin (late 15th–early 16th Century), 1 painting : LACMA
Shunsō Shōjū (1751–1839), 2 paintings : LACMA
Jangarh Singh Shyam (1962–2001), 1 painting : LACMA
Venkat Shyam (b.1970), 1 painting : LACMA
Sim Sajong (1707–1769), 1 painting : LACMA
David Alfaro Siqueiros (1896–1974), 4 paintings : LACMA
Allen Smith Jr. (1810–1890), 2 paintings : LACMA
Josh Smith (b.1976), 1 painting : LACMA
Soga Shōhaku (1730–1781), 4 paintings : LACMA
Soga Shōhaku (attributed), 2 paintings : LACMA
Sōhō Takuan (1573–1645), 1 painting : LACMA
Sōkan (16th Century), 1 painting : LACMA
Sokhwan Ch'oe (1808–?), 1 painting : LACMA
Mori Sosen (1747–1821), 2 paintings : LACMA
Chaïm Soutine (1893–1943), 2 paintings : LACMA
Moses Soyer (1899–1974), 2 paintings : LACMA
Eugene Speicher (1883–1962), 2 paintings : LACMA
Frederick Randolph Spencer (1806–1875), 2 paintings : LACMA
Theodoros Stamos (1922–1997), 2 paintings : LACMA
Gherardo Starnina (1354–1409), 2 paintings : LACMA
Frank Stella (b.1936), 5 paintings : LACMA
Will Henry Stevens (1881–1949), 1 painting : LACMA
Pierre Subleyras (1699–1749), 2 paintings : LACMA
Thomas Sully (1783–1872), 2 paintings : LACMA
Elza Sunderland (1903–1991), 18 paintings : LACMA
Suzuki Kiitsu (1796–1858), 2 paintings : LACMA

T
Tai Hsi (1801–1860), 11 paintings : LACMA
Taikan Monju (1766–1842), 2 paintings : LACMA
Takada Keiho (1674–1755), 1 painting : LACMA
Mori Takamasa (1791–1864), 1 painting : LACMA
Rufino Tamayo (1899–1991), 9 paintings : LACMA
Tang Guanyu (20th Century), 1 painting : LACMA
Henry Ossawa Tanner (1859–1937), 2 paintings : LACMA
Tanomura Chikuden (1777–1835), 1 painting : LACMA
Tanzio da Varallo (ca. 1580–ca. 1632), 1 painting : LACMA
Nicolas Antoine Taunay (1755–1830), 1 painting : LACMA
Henry Taylor (b.1958), 2 paintings : LACMA
David Teniers the Younger (1610–1690), 3 paintings : LACMA
Tenryūdōjin (1718–1810), 1 painting : LACMA
Mori Tessan (1775–1841), 1 painting : LACMA
Abbott Handerson Thayer (1849–1921), 1 painting : LACMA
Giovanni Battista Tiepolo (1696–1770), 1 painting : LACMA
Tintoretto (1518–1594), 1 painting : LACMA
Titian (1485–1576), 1 painting : LACMA
Mark Tobey (1890–1976), 2 paintings : LACMA
Bartolomeo di Tommaso (active 1425–1454), 1 painting : LACMA
Tōrei Enji (1721–1792), 3 paintings : LACMA
Tosa Mitsunori (1583–1638), 1 painting : LACMA
Jean François de Troy (1679–1752), 2 paintings : LACMA
Tsubaki Chinzan (1801–1854), 1 painting : LACMA
Tsukioka Sessai (1770–1839), 1 painting : LACMA 1 attributed :  LACMA
Tsukioka Yoshitoshi (1839–1892), 1 painting : LACMA
Luc Tuymans (b.1958), 1 painting : LACMA

U
Ugolino di Nerio (1295–1347), 1 painting : LACMA

V
Pierre-Henri de Valenciennes (1750–1819), 1 painting : LACMA
Valentin de Boulogne (1591–1632), 1 painting : LACMA
Jeffrey Vallance (b.1955), 2 paintings : LACMA
Alison Van Pelt (b.1963), 1 painting : LACMA
Victor Vasarely (1908–1997), 2 paintings : LACMA
Giorgio Vasari (1511–1574), 1 painting : LACMA
Chris Vasell (b.1974), 1 painting : LACMA
Elihu Vedder (1836–1923), 2 paintings : LACMA
Otto van Veen (1556–1629), 1 painting : LACMA
Adriaen van de Velde (1636–1672), 2 paintings : LACMA
Willem van de Velde the Younger (1633–1707), 2 paintings : LACMA
Paolo Veneziano (before 1300–ca. 1360), 1 painting : LACMA
Paolo Veronese (1528–1588), 2 paintings : LACMA
Maurice de Vlaminck (1876–1958), 2 paintings : LACMA
Simon de Vlieger (1600–1653), 1 painting : LACMA
Simon Vouet (1590–1649), 3 paintings : LACMA
Simon Vouet (1590–1649), 3 paintings : LACMA
Édouard Vuillard (1868–1940), 4 paintings : LACMA

W
Andy Warhol (1928–1987), 4 paintings : LACMA
Shōtei Watanabe (1851–1918), 7 paintings : LACMA
Watanabe Shikō (1683–1755), 6 paintings : LACMA
Darren Waterston (b.1965), 1 painting : LACMA
Frederick Judd Waugh (1861–1940), 2 paintings : LACMA
J. Alden Weir (1852–1919), 2 paintings : LACMA
Julie Weiss, 1 painting : LACMA
Wen Ding (1766–1852), 4 paintings : LACMA
Wen Zhengming (1470–1559), 1 painting : LACMA
William Wendt (1865–1946), 3 paintings : LACMA
Francis Wheatley (1747–1801), 2 paintings : LACMA
Orrin Augustine White (1883–1969), 1 painting : LACMA
Kehinde Wiley (b.1977), 1 painting : LACMA
Emanuel de Witte (1617–1692), 2 paintings : LACMA
Emerson Woelffer (1914–2003), 2 paintings : LACMA
Joachim Wtewael (1566–1638), 1 painting : LACMA
Alexander Helwig Wyant (1836–1892), 2 paintings : LACMA

X
Xiao Yuncong (1596–1673), 1 painting : LACMA
Xie Jin (1747–1819), 1 painting : LACMA

Y
Yamaguchi Sekkei (1644/48–1732), 1 painting : LACMA
Yamaguchi Soken (1759–1818), 2 paintings : LACMA
Yamaoka Beika (1868–1914), 1 painting : LACMA
Yanagisawa Kien (1706–1758), 1 painting : LACMA
Yayoi Kusama (b.1929), 1 painting : LACMA
Yek (b.1968), 1 painting : LACMA
Yi Jaegwan (1783–1837), 1 painting : LACMA
Yōgetsu (15th Century), 1 painting : LACMA
Yokoi Kinkoku (1761–1832), 3 paintings : LACMA
Yong Sin, 1 painting : LACMA
Yonggwan Ch'oe (17th Century), 1 painting : LACMA
Yu Youren (1879–1964), 1 painting : LACMA
Yuan Jiang (c.1671–c.1746), 2 paintings : LACMA
Yuan Yao (18th Century), 1 painting : LACMA

Z
Norman Zammitt (1931–2007), 2 paintings : LACMA
Zhang Haiying (b.1972), 1 painting : LACMA
Zhang Huan (b.1965), 1 painting : LACMA
Zhou Zhimian (16th Century), 1 painting : LACMA
Marco Zoppo (1433–1478), 1 painting : LACMA

References
Los Angeles County Museum of Art website
 :commons:Category:Los Angeles County Museum of Art
 Netherlands Institute for Art History

Los Angeles County Museum of Art
Los Angeles County Museum of Art
.
People associated with the Los Angeles County Museum of Art
painters